Buraka Som Sistema was an electronic dance music project from Portugal, specializing in a fusion of techno beats with the African zouk and kuduro genre. It is generally credited with creating the "zouk bass" and "progressive kuduro" variant and has received an MTV European Music Award.
In 2015 Buraka Som Sistema said they would be taking an hiatus starting in 2016, and on July 1st 2016 they performed live for the last time in Lisbon.

Origins
Buraka Som Sistema was founded in 2002 by Branko (João Barbosa), Rui Pité (DJ Riot), Andro Carvalho (Conductor) and Kalaf Ângelo.

Barbosa and Pité were producers from the Cool Train Crew collective, for which Kalaf was a frequent vocal collaborator. They were interested in creating a kuduro project, and had previously worked together as 1-UIK Project. They met Carvalho, a hip-hop producer from Angola and member of the hip-hop band Conjunto Ngonguenha, while he was in Portugal.

Buraka Som Sistema is the Portuguese word for word translation for Buraka Sound System, keeping the English word order (the correct translation would be "Sistema de Som da Buraka"). They took their name, Buraka, from the freguesia (urban district) of Buraca, located in the municipality of Amadora, in the suburbs of Lisbon.

Career
Their first release was From Buraka to the World, an EP released on the Portuguese label Enchufada, which include the single "Yah!", featuring vocals by Angolan hip-hop MC Petty. It was followed by another Petty vocalized track, "Wawaba", and a re-release of From Buraka to the World, expanded to a full album.

After touring in several European countries, including playing at the Glastonbury Festival and Roskilde Festival, the three producers released "Sound of Kuduro" in 2007, which features rapping by M.I.A., DJ Znobia, Saborosa and Puto Prata. The track was a precursor to their second album, Black Diamond, which was released in 2008 by Sony BMG, followed by a new single, "Kalemba (Wegue Wegue)", with vocals by Pongolove. They are currently signed on to Aftercluv Dance Lab, a Latin EDM label launched by Universal Music.
On July 1st 2016 Buraka Som sistema curated Globaile, a music event at the Torre de Belém grounds, as part of the Festas de Lisboa, where they performed their last concert.

Usage in media
Their song was featured in EA Sports video game such as "Kalemba (Wegue-Wegue)" featuring Pongolove in FIFA 10 and "Restless" in 2010 FIFA World Cup South Africa. "Hangover (Ba Ba Ba)" is also featured in the video game Just Dance 2016. Their song Bota also featured in a 2014 adidas advert featuring Dani Alves .

Discography

Studio albums

Singles

Awards
In the MTV Europe Music Awards 2007, they were 8th (out of 19) in the New Sounds of Europe International Competition and were one of the nominees for the Best Portuguese Act category. In the MTV Europe Music Awards 2008, the band won the Best Portuguese Act award.

MTV Europe Music Awards
The MTV Europe Music Awards is an annual awards ceremony established in 1994 by MTV Europe. 

|-
|rowspan="2"| 2007 || Buraka Som Sistema || New Sounds of Europe ||
|-
| Buraka Som Sistema || Best Portuguese Act || 
|-
|rowspan="1"| 2008 || Buraka Som Sistema || Best Portuguese Act || 
|-
|rowspan="1"| 2009 || Buraka Som Sistema || Best Portuguese Act || 
|-

Golden Globes
The Golden Globes is an annual awards ceremony by Portuguese TV station SIC. 

|-
|rowspan="1"| 2009 || Buraka Som Sistema|| Group Of The Year|| 
|-

European Border Breakers Awards
The European Border Breakers Award is an annual awards ceremony for artists or groups who reached audiences outside their own countries with their first internationally released album in the past year. 

|-
|rowspan="1"| 2009 || Black Diamond || European Border Breakers Award|| 
|-

BEFFTA Awards
Buraka Som Sistema won the BEFFTA International Entertainment Icons award on October 25, 2014. They told Sound And Motion magazine that they "were honoured to collect an award."

References

BBC article 
Don't Panic: article
Sup Magazine: interview
Buraka Som Sistema interview
Buraka Som Sistema RBMA lecture

External links

Enchufada label
Buraka Som Sistema Essential Mix
Official Website
http://kalafangelo.com/

Portuguese electronic music groups
Universal Music Latin Entertainment artists
MTV Europe Music Award winners